Katie Malcolmson, known professionally as Katie Malco, is a British indie rock musician based in Northampton, England.

Career
Malco began her career releasing an EP in 2011 titled Katie Malco and the Slow Parade  on Alcopop! Records. Malco released her second EP in 2013 titled Tearing Ventricles. In 2020, Malco signed to Richmond, Virginia-based record label 6131 Records. Her debut album, Failures, was released through the label on 5 June 2020. The album was one of NPR Music's "Best New Albums" upon the week of its release. Malco has toured with Julien Baker, Jenny Lewis, Bob Mould, Fenne Lily, Dawes, and Joy Formidable.

Personal life

Malco was born in Dunfermline, Fife to Scottish parents. She, her parents and her siblings moved to Northampton when she was a child.

Discography

Studio albums
Failures (2020, 6131 Records)

EPs
Katie Malco and the Slow Parade (2011, Alcopop! Records)
Tearing Ventricles (2013, Alcopop! Records)

References

British rock singers
British indie rock musicians
British folk rock musicians
Year of birth missing (living people)
Living people